Palmartona is a genus of moths in the family Zygaenidae. It contains only one species, Palmartona catoxantha, which is found from Myanmar eastwards throughout Malaysia, Singapore, Indonesia (Sumatra, Nias, Java, Bangka, Kalimantan, Sulawesi), the Philippines (Palawan) to Papua New Guinea. There is one record for Australia (Queensland).

The length of the forewings is 6-7.5 mm for males and 6.5–8 mm for females. The upperside of forewings and hindwings is dark brown, the hindwing with a yellow costal margin. The underside of both wings is light grey-brown with yellow scales along the costa and a yellow mark before the apex on the forewing and two parallel yellow stripes on the hindwing anteriorly.

The larvae feed on Cocos nucifera, Metroxylon and Livistona species. Musa and even Poaceae species such as Saccharum may serve as temporary hosts for later instar larvae. Young larvae feed on the underside of the leaves and skeletonize the leaves. The last instar feeds freely on the edges of the leaves of the host-plant, making characteristic holes. The larvae are considered a serious pest of coconut palms in south-east Asia, but outbreaks are rare. They are slug-like and have a pale yellow or almost white ground colour when young. Mature larvae are yellow and greenish yellow with a yellow head and a few dark stripes and a blackish violet dorsal stripe.

References

Procridinae
Monotypic moth genera
Moths of Asia
Moths of Australia